Juan Antonio de Iza Zamácola y Ocerín (1756–1826) was a Spanish journalist, historian and writer. He is best known for his music criticism and his collections of folk songs.

References

Spanish male writers
1756 births
1826 deaths
18th-century Spanish journalists
19th-century Spanish journalists